The Employer's Liability (Defective Equipment) Act 1969 (c. 37) is a short statute which makes employers strictly liable for defective equipment that causes any injury. The purpose was to ensure that employers fully insure their staff for all health and safety risks, and are encouraged to put in place preventative measures.

Case law
Hewison v Meridian Shipping Services Pte [2002] EWCA Civ 1821, allowing an employer an illegality defence, Ward LJ dissenting.

See also
UK labour law

References
Jeremy Stranks, Health and Safety Law

United Kingdom labour law
1969 in labor relations
United Kingdom Acts of Parliament 1969
Employers